Master-General of the Ordnance (Gftm) was in Sweden a chief officer of the Krigskollegium ("Board of Warfare") from 1682 to 1865, then until 1968 in the Royal Swedish Army Materiel Administration.

History
In Sweden, the Master-General of the Ordnance (Generalfälttygmästare) was an appointment for a member of the Krigskollegium ("Board of Warfare") from 1675 and the head of the Artillery Office (Artillerikontoret) from 1682 to 1794 and from 1807 to 1897. The Master-General of the Ordnance was responsible for the central administration of the artillery, the procurement and care of the army's weapons and ammunition, and for the land defence' (lantförsvaret) stock supplies, the so-called Ordnance Storage (Tygförrådet). Earlier, he was called Riksfälttygsmästare. Between 1782 and 1865, the Master-General of the Ordnance was the head of the Ordnance Department of the Royal Swedish Army Materiel Administration, with, among others, the Deputy Chief of Ordnance and two Tygmästare ("Master of the Ordnance") of regimental officers or captain's rank, as subordinates.

The Master-General of the Ordnance was head of the artillery until 1898. That year a change was carried out through which the artillery regiments and corps were placed under the command of the commander of each army division, while the Master-General of the Ordnance retained the command over the Artillery Staff and the artillery workshops and ordnance staff. However, he still had the obligation to inspect the artillery's exercises, and his complete title was therefore the Master-General of the Ordnance and Inspector of Artillery. He also served as head of the Artillery Department of the Royal Swedish Army Materiel Administration. As Inspector, he was responsible for the artillery in the same way as the Inspectors of the Infantry and the Cavalry, and also commanded and supervised the Swedish Army Artillery School (Artilleriets skjutskola, ArtSS).

As Master-General of the Ordnance, it was imperative for him to pay constant attention to the improvement of firearms with associated ammunition and equipment, and for that purpose at the King's request to employ or attempt to arrange for them. Furthermore, he would submit to the King for review and establishing proposals for new or changed weapon designs and more. Finally, he would oversee operations at artillery factories and ordnance establishments and oversee manufacturing of weapons, ammunition and artillery equipment for the needs of the army. To his assistant, the Master-General of the Ordnance and the Inspector of Artillery in the latter capacity had at his disposal certain personnel from the Artillery Staff. This personnel, which together formed the Artillery Inspectorate (Artilleriinspektionen), was made up partly of the head of the Artillery Staff, who also served as commander of the Swedish Army Artillery School, and partly of the chief of staff of the Artillery Inspectorate, a major of the Artillery Staff, with the subordinate Equipment Department and the Inspector's Office Department. The personnel in the departments consisted of Artillery Staff officers and commissioned officers.

In 1936, the Master-General of the Ordnance's role as Inspector of Artillery ceased and in 1937 he became the head of the Swedish Army Ordnance Corps. In 1968 the post was eliminated.

Masters-General of the Ordnance
1682–1692: Per Larsson Sparre
1692–1693: Erik Dahlbergh
1693–1710: Johan Siöblad
1710–1712: Vacant
1712–1715: Reinhold Johan von Fersen
1715–1719: Henning Rudolf Horn af Rantzien
1719–1724: Hugo Hamilton Hamilton af Hageby
1724–1728: Vacant
1728–1740: Fredrik Magnus Cronberg
1741–1754: Per Siöblad
1754–1757: Vacant
1757–1759: Thomas Cunninghame
1759–1761: Carl Ehrensvärd (acting)
1761–1765: Carl Funck (acting)
1766–1772: Anders Reinhold Wrangel
1772–1781: Reinhold Anrep
1781–1784: Gabriel von Spången (acting)
1784–1791: Carl Gideon Sinclair
1791–1800: Carl Ulrik Silfverschiöld
1800–1803: Nils Fredrik Ehrenström
1803–1807: Vacant
1807–1815: Carl von Helvig
1816–1821: Carl von Cardell
1821–1844: Crown Prince Oscar
1828–1834: Claes Josef Breitholtz
1844–1849: Axel Gustaf von Arbin
1849–1857: Crown Prince Charles
1857–1867: Fabian Wrede af Elimä

See also
Deputy Chief of Ordnance

Footnotes

References

Notes

Print

Military appointments of Sweden